Jonathan Hilbert (born 21 April 1995) is a German racewalker. He won the silver medal in the men's 50 kilometres walk at the 2020 Summer Olympics held in Tokyo, Japan. In 2019, he competed in the men's 50 kilometres walk at the World Athletics Championships held in Doha, Qatar. He finished in 23rd place.

In 2014, he competed in the men's 10,000 metres walk at the World Junior Championships in Athletics held in Eugene, Oregon, United States. In 2017, he finished in 6th place in the men's 20 kilometres walk at the European Athletics U23 Championships held in Bydgoszcz, Poland.

International competitions

References

External links 
 

Living people
1995 births
Place of birth missing (living people)
German male racewalkers
World Athletics Championships athletes for Germany
German national athletics champions
Athletes (track and field) at the 2020 Summer Olympics
Medalists at the 2020 Summer Olympics
Olympic silver medalists in athletics (track and field)
Olympic silver medalists for Germany
Olympic athletes of Germany
Olympic male racewalkers
People from Mühlhausen
Sportspeople from Thuringia